Dorothy Hazard was a seventeenth-century English religious reformer who played a part in the defence of the city of Bristol during the English Civil War. Despite her marriage to a Puritan minister, she founded a Dissenter church in Bristol, which became the city's first Baptist church, Broadmead Baptist Church.

Religious life
Little is known of Hazard's early life. She was married to a grocer named Anthony Kelly, and after his death continued to manage their shop in Bristol. At this time, she was a supporter of the Separatist movement, and as such was the target of persecution for her beliefs; on at least one occasion her shop was vandalised and the windows broken. In the late 1630s a Puritan preacher named Matthew Hazard took up residence in the city, and the widow Dorothy Kelly was persuaded to marry him. Her husband later became the minister of Christ Church with St Ewen. This persuaded her to split completely with the Church of England and join the Separatists. Along with four men - Mr Atkins, Mr Poole, Mr Moone and Rev. Bacon - she founded the first Dissenter church in Bristol in 1640; meetings were held at both the Hazard residence and at Rev. Bacon's house. The church became affiliated with the Baptist movement, and has survived for over 300 years.

English Civil War
During the English Civil War, Bristol was besieged by the Royalist troops of Sir Ralph Hopton. During the storming of the city, Hazard and her friend Joan Batten led a group of women to the city's Frome Gate, where they barricaded breaches in the walls with sandbags, and encouraged the soldiers in the defence of the city. However, despite Hazard's offer to Bristol's governor, Nathaniel Fiennes, to gather a group of women and act as a human shield, Fiennes, subsequently surrendered to the Royalists. Hazard's defence of the wall subsequently became the subject for a mural by Gerald Moira, which was commissioned by Sir Claude Phillips for the decoration of Bristol's Old Council House in 1923.

References

17th-century Protestant religious leaders
17th-century English businesspeople
English Dissenters
People from Bristol
Women in the English Civil War
17th-century English businesswomen
Female religious leaders